Serhiy Serhiyovych Rusyan (born 5 August 1999) is a Ukrainian professional footballer who plays as a right midfielder for Ukrainian club Ahrobiznes Volochysk.

References

External links
 
 
 

1999 births
Living people
Sportspeople from Makiivka
Ukrainian footballers
Association football midfielders
FC Arsenal Kyiv players
FC Olimpik Donetsk players
FC Oleksandriya players
FC Dinaz Vyshhorod players
SC Chaika Petropavlivska Borshchahivka players
FC Ahrobiznes Volochysk players
Ukrainian Premier League players
Ukrainian Second League players